The Global Custodian is a trade publication covering the international securities services industry. GlobalCustodian.com refers to the website of Global Custodian magazine, which provides daily news and events coverage of the securities services industry, particularly custodian banks, but also including fund administration, securities financing/lending, prime brokerage, private equity, derivatives and other related topics.

Published six times per year, Global Custodian magazine provides analysis and commentary on the latest news and events taking place in the international securities services industry. The magazine is defined by a series of annual surveys that have become benchmarks for the industry. The magazine is the sister publication of The TRADE Magazine.

History 
Founded in 1989 by Dominic Hobson and Charles Ruffel, the original focus of the magazine was on securities processing operations: articles that explore how shares trade and settle and are held. Its editorial scope has since expanded to include fund administration, securities lending and financing, prime brokerage and the infrastructure of the global securities industry (Central Securities Depositories or CSDs, International Central Securities Depositories or ICSDs, payments systems and other industry bodies and initiatives). The editorial content of the magazine is now also supported by industry-standard surveys that address how the performance of custodian banks, fund administrators, prime brokers and tri-party securities financing providers compare with each other and within individual markets.

With its news coverage and digital offering, Global Custodian's major awards evenings are among its flagship offerings - with a London Custody awards evening in March and a New York dinner honouring the leaders in hedge fund administration and prime brokerage during November.

Global Custodian was one of the first publications covering the financial services industry to launch a video news platform, called GCTV. Since 2007, GCTV has released numerous documentaries about the securities services industry in addition to its regular online news coverage.

The GC Legends Page serves as the Hall of Fame for the securities services industry, listing those who have made a difference during their career.

In October 2015, Global Custodian appointed Jonathan Watkins as editor, joining from The TRADE. In 2018, Watkins and colleagues Daljit Sokhi and Richard Schwartz conducted a management buyout from previous owners Strategic Insight.

The publication is run out of London.

Surveys 
Each issue of GC magazine contains one or more annual survey reports, which rate financial institutions in various sectors of the securities services industry. Industry surveys carried by Global Custodian include:

Agent Banks in Major Markets
Agent Banks in Emerging Markets
Agent Banks in Frontier Markets
ETF Administration
Hedge Fund Administration
Mutual Fund Administration
Prime Brokerage
Private Equity Fund Administration
Tri-Party Securities Financing

See also 
Custodian bank
Securities Services

Professional and trade magazines
Business magazines published in the United Kingdom
Business magazines published in the United States
Magazines established in 1989
Magazines published in London